New York City's 15th City Council district is one of 51 districts in the New York City Council. It has been represented by Democrat Oswald Feliz since a 2021 special election to succeed fellow Democrat Ritchie Torres.

Geography
District 15 covers neighborhoods in the geographical center of the Bronx, including some or all of Belmont, Tremont, Fordham, Bedford Park, Williamsbridge, East Tremont, Van Nest, Allerton, and West Farms.
 Bronx Park, which contains both the Bronx Zoo and the New York Botanical Garden, is located within the district.

The district overlaps with Bronx Community Boards 3, 4, 5, 6, 7, 9, 11, and 12, and with New York's 13th, 14th, 15th, and 16th congressional districts. It also overlaps with the 32nd, 33rd, 34th, and 36th districts of the New York State Senate, and with the 77th, 78th, 79th, 80th, 86th, and 87th districts of the New York State Assembly.

Recent election results

2021
In 2019, voters in New York City approved Ballot Question 1, which implemented ranked-choice voting in all local elections. Under the new system, voters have the option to rank up to five candidates for every local office. Voters whose first-choice candidates fare poorly will have their votes redistributed to other candidates in their ranking until one candidate surpasses the 50 percent threshold. If one candidate surpasses 50 percent in first-choice votes, then ranked-choice tabulations will not occur.

2021 special
In November 2020, Councilmember Ritchie Torres was elected to represent New York's 15th congressional district, triggering a special election for his Council seat. Like all municipal special elections in New York City, the race was officially nonpartisan, with all candidates running on ballot lines of their own creation.

2017

2013

References

New York City Council districts